The Greater Accra Regional Minister is the Ghana government official who is responsible for overseeing the administration of the Greater Accra Region of Ghana. The region was initially an administrative district within the Eastern Region of Ghana. The region was formally created by law in July 1982 by Provisional National Defence Council government through the Greater Accra Region Law (PNDCL 26) as a legally separate region. Currently, the southern boundary of the Greater Accra Region is the Atlantic Ocean. To the east is the Volta Region, Central Region to the west and the Eastern Region to the north. There are currently sixteen administrative regions in Ghana.

List of Greater Accra Regional Ministers

See also

Ministers of the Ghanaian Government
Greater Accra Region

Notes

Politics of Ghana
Greater Accra Regional Minister